Caim is a hamlet in the  community of Llangoed, Ynys Môn, Wales, which is 144.3 miles (232.2 km) from Cardiff and 225.8 miles (363.4 km) from London. Cafnan is represented in the Senedd by Rhun ap Iorwerth (Plaid Cymru) and is part of the Ynys Môn constituency in the House of Commons.

See also
List of localities in Wales by population

References

Villages in Anglesey